A&M Records, Inc. v. Napster, Inc., 114 F.Supp.2d 896 (2000), was the district court case which preceded the landmark intellectual property case of A&M Records, Inc. v. Napster, Inc., 239 F.3d 1004 (2001). The case was heard by Judge Marilyn Hall Patel of the United States District Court for the Northern District of California.  Napster appealed this case to United States Court of Appeals for the Ninth Circuit.

Procedural background

Plaintiffs alleged both contributory and vicarious copyright infringement by Napster, and on December 6, 1999, filed a motion for a preliminary injunction to stop the exchange of plaintiffs' songs on the service immediately.

In defense, Napster cited Sony v. Universal City Studios for the argument that (1) the users of its system were engaging in fair use and (2) the Napster software was capable of substantial non-infringing use.  Napster also alleged (3) a First Amendment objection to the injunction, claiming it suppressed free speech.

Holding
Judge Patel granted the preliminary injunction, on the grounds that the plaintiffs demonstrated a reasonable likelihood of success.

First, she briefly observed that plaintiffs could show that "Napster users are engaged in direct infringement."  Judge Patel then turned to Napster's two arguments for why such third-party infringement was not illegal:  fair use and substantial noninfringing use (the "staple article of commerce" doctrine from Sony v. Universal).

Fair use
First, she found that the use was "commercial":

Second, she found that the second factor also cuts against fair use, because "the copyrighted musical compositions and sound recordings are creative in nature."
Third, she found that fair use is also not warranted by the third factor, because Napster users copy the entirety of the copyrighted work.
As to the fourth factor,

She then discussed the three specific uses that defendants alleged were "fair"—sampling, space-shifting, and the authorized distribution of new artists' work.

First, she rejected that sampling was a personal (rather than commercial) use.

She also commented that,

Then, she rejected that the space shifting in this case was either a fair use or protected under the staple article of commerce doctrine.
First, she observed that the space shifting discussion in RIAA v. Diamond was inapplicable because that was a case applying an inapplicable statute.
Also, although defendants argued "that space-shifting is sufficiently analogous to time-shifting broadcasts to merit the protection of Sony", Judge Patel found that "the instant matter is distinguishable from Sony [where] time-shifting represented the principal, rather than an occasional use of VCRs."
She added, "[E]ven if space-shifting is a fair use, it is not substantial enough to preclude [contributory or vicarious copyright] liability under the staple article of commerce doctrine," explaining that defendant's burden (under Sony)  is to "show that space-shifting constitutes a commercially significant use of Napster."  (On appeal, the Ninth Circuit held that Judge Patel's analysis here misconstrued the passage from Sony that the product must be "capable of substantial noninfringing uses.")
In a footnote, she distinguished the Fifth Circuit case of Vault Corp. v. Quaid Software Ltd., a case which found no contributory copyright infringement when Quaid's computer diskette had one substantial non-infringing use.  Judge Patel noted that other jurisdictions had limited the holding in that case to situations where the product's primary purpose is lawful.  And she noted that the Quaid court declined to consider whether another feature of Quaid's product was infringing because that feature would have no commercial value without the non-infringing product—a circumstance which (she implied) did not apply in this case, because "The Napster service arguably has little commercial value without the availability of copyrighted popular music."

Staple article of commerce doctrine
Judge Patel also asserted that, even given "the existence of a potentially unobjectionable use like space-shifting," she would not apply the staple article of commerce doctrine "because ... Napster exercises ongoing control over its service ... [it] maintains and supervises an integrated system that users must access to upload or download files. Defendant continues to exercise control over the device."  She distinguished Sony, where "the defendant's participation did not extend past manufacturing and selling the VCRs: 'the only contact between Sony and the users of the Betamax ... occurred at the moment of sale.'"
And she rejected the relevance of "other potential non-infringing uses of Napster", noting (for example) that "the New Artist Program may not represent a substantial or commercially significant aspect of Napster", and in any event that the plaintiffs "do not seek an injunction covering [certain non-infringing activities on Napster]".

Contributory copyright infringement
Knowledge.
First, Judge Patel stated that "Plaintiffs present convincing evidence that Napster executives actually know about and sought to protect use of the service to transfer illegal MP3 files."  For example, she quoted co-founder Sean Parker, who "mention[ed] the need to remain ignorant of users' real names and IP addresses 'since they are exchanging pirated music,' " as well as the fact that "the RIAA informed [defendant] of more than 12,000 infringing files [which] are still available using the Napster service."
In this context, she noted that "the law does not require actual knowledge of specific acts of infringement."
She cited Gershwin v. Columbia, which held that "general knowledge" that third parties performed copyrighted works satisfied the knowledge element of contributory infringement. She also cited Sega I, where plaintiffs established knowledge "even though electronic bulletin board company did not know exactly when infringing video games would be uploaded to or downloaded from bulletin board."
As a result, she found no relevancy in "defendant's argument that titles in the Napster directory cannot be used to distinguish infringing and non-infringing files and thus that defendant cannot know about infringement by any particular user of any particular musical recording or composition."
Nor was she convinced by any analogy to Religious Technology Center v. Netcom On-Line Communication Services.  In that case, a judge, after finding that further discovery was needed to determine whether a BBS operator had knowledge that his system was being used to distribute copyrighted works, observed in dicta that the operator will only be held to "reasonably verify" a claim of infringement, and can assert "lack of knowledge" due to various impediments to his knowledge.  Judge Patel distinguished Napster from the BBS:  "Napster is not an Internet service provider that acts as a mere conduit for the transfer of files. ... Rather, it offers search and directory functions specifically designed to allow users to locate music, the majority of which is copyrighted.
Finally, she observed that, "at the least, defendant had constructive knowledge of its users' illegal conduct," applying "the objective test for constructive knowledge--defendant had reason to know about infringement by third parties." (On this basis, the court noted in a footnote that Napster can therefore not be protected by DMCA 512(d)(1)(A).)

Material contribution
Judge Patel found that Napster materially contributed to the infringing activity.  She cited Fonovisa, Inc. v. Cherry Auction, Inc., and agreed with plaintiffs' characterization that "Napster is essentially an Internet swap meet," noting that "Napster supplies the propriety software, search engine, servers, and means of establishing a connection between users' computers. Without the support services defendant provides, Napster users could not find and download the music they want with the ease of which defendant boasts."  She cited Sega II, where an electronic bulletin board service, acting as a central depository for unauthorized copies of compute games, materially contributed to infringement "because it provided software, hardware, and phone lines needed for uploading and downloading copyrighted material"; and Religious Technology Center v. Netcom, which held that an Internet access provider, in its degree of control over infringement, is less like a landlord than like a radio station replaying infringing broadcasts.

Vicarious copyright infringement
Right and ability to supervise
The court found sufficient evidence of supervisory control in the fact that Napster can block users about whom rights holders complain.
Direct financial interest
The court found this element easily satisfied.

Remaining arguments

The court also rejected defendants' first amendment challenge, misuse of copyright defense, claim of waiver, and claim that plaintiffs failed to present evidence of copyright registration.

Preliminary injunction
The court considered the applicable law regarding preliminary injunction relief, and found an injunction appropriate.

Notes

References

External links 
 A & M RECORDS, INC. v. Napster, Inc., 114 F. Supp. 2d 896 (N.D. Cal. 2000), text of the decision

United States copyright case law